Callicore astarte, the Astarte eighty-eight, is a species of butterfly of the family Nymphalidae. It is found from Mexico south to Brazil.

Subspecies
C. a. astarte (Surinam, French Guiana, Brazil (Pará))
C. a. codomannus  (Fabricius, 1781)  (Brazil (Rio de Janeiro))
C. a. patelina  (Hewitson, 1853)  (southern Mexico to Costa Rica, Guatemala)
C. a. stratiotes  (C. & R. Felder, 1861)  (Brazil (Amazonas))
C. a. casta  (Salvin, 1869)  (Mexico)
C. a. selima  (Guénee, 1872)  (Brazil (Minas Gerais, São Paulo, Santa Catarina, Goiás, Mato Grosso))
C. a. antillena  (Kaye, 1914)  (Trinidad)
C. a. otheres  (Fruhstorfer, 1916)  (Colombia)
C. a. astartoides  (Dillon, 1948)  (Bolivia)
C. a. lilliputa  (Dillon, 1948)  (Colombia)
C. a. staudingeri  (Dillon, 1948)  (Venezuela)
C. a. panamaensis Kariya, 2006

References

Biblidinae
Butterflies of North America
Butterflies of Central America
Nymphalidae of South America
Butterflies described in 1779